The Far West Express was an Australian passenger train operated by the New South Wales Government Railways from December 1957 until September 1975 from Dubbo to Bourke, Cobar and Coonamble.

It connected at Dubbo in the morning with the overnight Western Mail from Sydney, returning in the afternoon to connect with the return Mail in the evening. The train was formed of an air-conditioned DEB set with a van off the train from Sydney attached to the rear. It operated to Bourke thrice weekly, Cobar once weekly and Coonamble twice weekly.

It ceased in September 1975 when the Public Transport Commission introduced a fleet of six Denning road coaches to operate the services radiating from Dubbo.

Further reading
Australian Railway History October 2012

References

Named passenger trains of New South Wales
Railway services introduced in 1957
Railway services discontinued in 1975
1957 establishments in Australia
1975 disestablishments in Australia
Discontinued railway services in Australia